Zulhijjah Binti Azan, (born 12 July 1990 in Selangor) is a professional squash player who represents Malaysia. She reached a career-high world ranking of World No. 63 in November 2013.

Career
In 2014, she was part of the Malaysian team that won the silver medal at the 2014 Women's World Team Squash Championships.

References

External links 

Malaysian female squash players
Living people
1990 births
Southeast Asian Games medalists in squash
Southeast Asian Games gold medalists for Malaysia
Competitors at the 2015 Southeast Asian Games
21st-century Malaysian women